Great Valley Airport  is a privately owned, public-use airport located one nautical mile (1.85 km) southeast of the central business district of Great Valley, a town in Cattaraugus County, New York, United States.

Facilities and aircraft 
It has one runway designated 6/24 with a turf surface measuring 3,800 by 60 feet (1,158 x 18 m). For the 12-month period ending October 21, 2007, the airport had 7,570 aircraft operations, an average of 20 per day: 97% general aviation and 3% military.

References

External links 
 Aerial image as of 28 March 1995 from USGS The National Map
 

Airports in New York (state)
Transportation buildings and structures in Cattaraugus County, New York